Dress is a short film shot in Hawaii and directed by Henry Ian Cusick who also plays the lead role of Ben Granger.

Synopsis
Ben's Hawaiian wife Maile has just died and he is struggling to cope with his own grief let alone that of his two sons.  Amid a refuge of alcohol and pills, Ben finds comfort in wearing Maile's dress. Jonas, his 4-year-old son is delighted with his new “Mommy” around the house and joins in with Ben's antics, which with the arrival of a wig at the home are getting out of control.  Frowned upon by their Hawaiian “Auntie” and the cause of huge embarrassment for his teenage son Koa, Bens extreme behavior creates more problems when Koa believes the woman in the dress to be his Dad's new girlfriend. The family discord escalates until the father and son relationship reaches a climax. Attempting a fresh start, they decide to donate Maile's dresses to a second hand shop. This is extremely hard for Ben and the very next morning he returns to the shop to get that one special dress back. The boys accept this with a lighter heart and they embrace their dads grieving process. The “Dress” becomes a part of family life in remembering Mom.

Awards
Best Short Narrative at Chicago's 2014 Peace on Earth Film Festival
USA Film Festival 
Hawaii International Film Festival Best Film Audience Award

References

External links
 Production Company
 

2013 short films
2013 films